Leon Monde (New York City; January 8, 1895 – after May 1931) was an American basketball player for the New York Renaissance (commonly known as the "Rens"), one of the dominant basketball teams of the 1920s and 1930s. Monde was a veteran of Negro league baseball, and was one of the first players for the Rens. In 1922, the Metropolitan Basketball Association (MBA) ordered his suspension from the Rens (then competing under their original name, the Spartan Braves) for having played baseball professionally, but the team refused. In 1963, the New York Renaissance franchise was inducted into the Naismith Memorial Basketball Hall of Fame.

Monde's draft registration card of June 1917 listed his residence as being on Cleveland Street in Brooklyn. He was employed as a "machine hand" and was supporting his mother, his wife, and a 14-year-old relative. In April 1930, The New York Age noted that Monde and his wife moved from Brooklyn to Eatontown, New Jersey. In 1931, Monde went into business selling tea and coffee.

References

1895 births
Year of death missing
20th-century African-American sportspeople
Negro league baseball players
African-American basketball players
American men's basketball players
Basketball players from New York City
New York Renaissance players